Tbilisi Caucasians ( T’bilisis Kavkasielebi) were a Georgian rugby union team formed to compete in the European Rugby Challenge Cup. The team competed in the qualifying stage of the 2014–15 European Rugby Challenge Cup against the Italian side, Rovigo Delta. The players were picked from the Georgian domestic rugby championship and the head coach was Levan Maisashvili.

Qualifying Competition

See also
 Georgian national rugby union team
 Rugby union in Georgia

References

External links
 Tbilisi Caucasians squad

Rugby union teams from Georgia (country)
Rugby clubs established in 2014
Sport in Tbilisi
2014 establishments in Georgia (country)
EPCR Challenge Cup